Pierre Moncuit is a Champagne house founded in Mesnil-sur-Oger in 1889. The vineyards are Grand Cru status.
Since 1977,   Nicole and Yves Moncuit, sister and brother,  have managed the estate. 
Pierre Moncuit wines are produced from a single vintage, and no reserve wines are blended into the non-vintage offerings.

References

French wine
Sparkling wines
Champagne producers
Wine merchants